Diastema is a genus of moths of the family Noctuidae. The genus was erected by Achille Guenée in 1852.

Species
 Diastema argillophora Dyar, 1914
 Diastema cnossia H. Druce, 1889
 Diastema dosceles Dyar, 1918
 Diastema lineata
 Diastema morata Schaus, 1894
 Diastema multigutta Felder & Rogenhofer, 1874
 Diastema panteles Dyar, 1913
 Diastema tigris Guenée, 1852

References

Acontiinae